The Wheel of Fortune or Rota Fortunae has been a concept and metaphor since ancient times referring to the capricious nature of Fate. Wheel of Fortune may also refer to:

Arts, entertainment, and media

Art
 The Wheel of Fortune (Burne-Jones), 1883 painting by Edward Burne-Jones

Games
 Big Six wheel, a casino game also known as the Wheel of Fortune
 Wheel of Fortune video games, based on the game show franchise
 Wheel of Fortune (Tarot card)

Literature 
 The Wheel of Fortune (novel), a 1984 novel by the English author Susan Howatch
 The Wheel of Fortune (play), a 1795 play by the British writer Richard Cumberland

Music 
 Wheel of Fortune, an album by Susan Raye
 Wheel of Fortune, an album by Robin Williamson and John Renbourn
 "Wheel of Fortune" (1951 song), originally performed by Johnny Hartman
 "Wheel of Fortune" (Ace of Base song)
 "Wheel of Fortune" (Eiko Shimamiya song)
 "Wheels of Fortune" (song), a song first released by the Doobie Brothers

Racing
 Wheel of Fortune (horse), a British racehorse

Television

Game shows
 Wheel of Fortune (American game show) (1975–present), an American game show created by Merv Griffin
 International versions of Wheel of Fortune, based on the American version:
 Wheel of Fortune (Australian game show)
 Wheel of Fortune (British game show)
 Wheel of Fortune (New Zealand game show)
 Wheel of Fortune (Philippine game show)
 La Ruota Della Fortuna, Italian game show
 Wheel of Fortune (1952 game show), a 1952–1953 American game show that aired on CBS that is unrelated to the later 1975 American game show

Episodes
 "Wheel of Fortune", series episode of The A-Team (season 4)
 "The Wheel of Fortune", third episode of the 1965 Doctor Who serial The Crusade
 "Wheel of Fortune", series episode of The Dead Zone
 "Wheels of Fortune", series episode of Frasier (season 9)

Places 
 Wheel of Fortune (house), listed on the U.S. National Register of Historic Places in Kent County, Delaware
 Wheel of Fortune, United States Virgin Islands, a settlement on the island of Saint Croix